Salarabad (also Romanized as Sālārābād; also known as Jāmīn) is a village in Gavrud Rural District, in the Central District of Sonqor County, Kermanshah Province, Iran. At the 2006 census, its population was 562, in 135 families.

References 

Populated places in Sonqor County